Jungmann is a German surname. Notable people with the surname include:

 Bernard Jungmann (1833–1895), Catholic priest
 Ctirad Jungmann, Czech rower
 Josef Jungmann (1773–1847), Bohemian linguist
 Nico Wilhelm Jungmann (1872–1935), Dutch painter
 Taylor Jungmann (born 1989), American baseball pitcher for the Milwaukee Brewers

See also
Jungman
Bücker Bü 131, German airplane

German-language surnames
Surnames from nicknames